"It Never Rains..." is an episode of the BBC sitcom, Only Fools and Horses. It was the sixth episode of series 2, and was first screened on 25 November 1982. In the episode, Del, Rodney and Grandad go on holiday to Spain. All is going well until Grandad gets arrested.

Synopsis
It has been endlessly raining for four days in Peckham, and the Trotters have not been able to sell any of their sun-hats.

At The Nag's Head, Del Boy meets his friend Alex, an out-of-work travel agent. They discuss about how they can boost their respective businesses, and Del suggests that Alex offer an 80% discount on a holiday to the next customer, who just happens to be Del.

Back at the flat, Del tells Rodney and Grandad that they are going to Benidorm, Spain. Rodney is worried that Grandad will cramp their style.

When they get to Benidorm, Del and Rodney manage to pick up a couple of girls, but when they go back to their hotel room, they find Grandad asleep with his false teeth by his bedside. The girls leave in disgust.

A few days later, on the beach, Rodney and Del discuss how Grandad has been acting nervous and emotionally distant since they arrived. Del tries to impress a "French" woman but ends up embarrassing himself. Meanwhile, Rodney discovers that Grandad has been arrested and after telling Del, the Trotter Brothers search for Grandad.

At the police station, Grandad tells his grandsons a long and confusing story about a possible reason for his arrest: in 1936, when his family was poor, Grandad and his friend Nobby Clarke hitchhiked all the way to Southampton, got a boat to Tangier, and after a failed attempt to join the French Foreign Legion, became gun-runners during the Spanish Civil War. Eventually, they were captured, Nobby was tortured, and the pair were deported to England. After hearing the story, Del bribes the guard into letting Grandad go, but it soon turns out that Grandad was only arrested for jaywalking and is free to go with no charge anyway, leaving Del out of pocket. Rodney says that they best go to the drug store to get cotton wool for Grandad's cuts and bruises. When Grandad replies that he has not got any cuts and bruises, Del says "It's early yet!".

Episode cast

Notes

Music
Mungo Jerry: "In The Summertime"

References

External links

1982 British television episodes
Only Fools and Horses (series 2) episodes
Spain in fiction
Television episodes about vacationing